Yevat railway station is a suburban railway station in Pune district, Maharashtra. Its code is YT. It serves Yevat, a suburban area of the city. The station consists of two platforms. The platforms are connect by a sturdy foot-over-bridge. It has basic facilities, however it is scenic. It serves as the closest railway station to visit the beautiful Hindu temple of [[Bhuleshwar|Bhuleshwar]] dedicated to Lord Shiva.

Trains

Trains passing through Yewat:

 Pune–Baramati Passenger
 Pune–Baramati–Daund–Pune Passenger
 Pune–Daund Passenger
 Pune–Daund Passenger
 Pune–Daund Fast Passenger
 Pune–Manmad Passenger
 Pune–Nizamabad Passenger
 Pune–Solapur Passenger
 Pune–Solapur Passenger

References

Pune Suburban Railway
Railway stations in Pune
Pune railway division
Railway stations in Pune district